40 Años (Spanish "cuarenta años") or 40 Anos (Portuguese "quarenta anos") may refer to:

40 Años (album), by Marco Antonio Solís, 2016
40 Años, an album by Amigos de Gines, 2010
40 Años, an album by Orquesta Filarmómoca de Bogotá, winner of the 2008 Latin Grammy Award for Best Instrumental Album
40 Años de la Sonora Matancera, an album by Sonora Matancera
40 Anos Depois, an album by João Bosco, 2012